Wu Feng may refer to:

Wu Feng (Qing dynasty) (1699–1769), Qing dynasty merchant allegedly killed by Taiwanese aboriginals
Wu Feng (engineer) (born 1951), Chinese engineer
Uğur Rıfat Karlova (born 1980), Turkish-Taiwanese television host, known by the stage name Wu Feng

See also
Wufeng (disambiguation)